Michael Walters (born 17 November 1939) is an English former professional footballer who played as a wing half.

Career
Born in Banbury, Walters spent his early career with Coventry City and Rugby Town. He signed for Bradford City from Rugby Town in January 1962. He made 19 league and 1 FA Cup appearances for the club, before moving to Burton Albion in June 1963. He spent two seasons at Burton before returning to Rugby Town. He later became a youth coach at Banbury United.

By 2010 he was living in Oxfordshire.

Sources

References

1939 births
Living people
English footballers
Coventry City F.C. players
Rugby Town F.C. (1945) players
Bradford City A.F.C. players
Burton Albion F.C. players
English Football League players
Association football wing halves
Sportspeople from Banbury